Gouesnou is a commune in the Finistère department of Brittany in north-western France.

International relations
Gouesnou is a satellite town of Brest. Gouesnou is twinned with the town of Brecon in Powys, south Wales enabling cultural exchanges to take place between these two Celtic regions.

Geography
The Penfeld River takes its source in this commune.

Population
Inhabitants of Gouesnou are known in French as Gouesnousiens.

Breton language
In 2008, 8.32% of primary-school children attended bilingual schools, where Breton language is taught alongside French.

See also
Communes of the Finistère department

References

External links

Official website 

Mayors of Finistère Association 

Communes of Finistère